Tilottoma Mojumdar is an Indian Bangali novelist, short story writer, poet, lyricist, and essayist. She writes in the Bengali language.

She was born in North Bengal, where she spent her childhood in tea plantations. She was educated at the Scottish Church College at the University of Calcutta.

Major novels 
ঋ
শামুকখোল
মানুষ শাবকের কথা 
ঈশ্বরের বাসা 
বসুধারা 
এসো সেপ্টেম্বর 
অর্জুন ও চার কন্যা 
রাজপাট 
চাঁদের গায়ে চাঁদ 
একতারা
সাধারণ মুখ
ধনেশ পাখির ঠোঁট
নির্জন সরস্বতী
আজও কন্যা
জোনাকিরা
প্রেতযোনি
চাঁদু
স্বর্গের শেষপ্রান্তে
রেফ
জল ও চুমুর উপাখ্যান
অমৃতানি
ঝুমরা
ব্যাং রাজকুমার

References

Bengali writers
1966 births
Living people
Scottish Church College alumni
University of Calcutta alumni
Indian women novelists
Indian women essayists
Indian women short story writers
Recipients of the Ananda Purashkar
Indian lyricists
Writers from Kolkata